{{DISPLAYTITLE:C20H21N}}
The molecular formula C20H21N (molar mass: 275.38 g/mol, exact mass: 275.1674 u) may refer to:

 Cyclobenzaprine (Flexeril)
 Octriptyline (SC-27,123)